Joachim Kirst (born 21 May 1947, in Neustadt/Harz) is a retired East German decathlete.

He competed for the sports club ASK Potsdam during his active career.

Achievements

1947 births
Living people
East German decathletes
Athletes (track and field) at the 1968 Summer Olympics
Athletes (track and field) at the 1972 Summer Olympics
Olympic athletes of East Germany
People from the Harz
National People's Army military athletes
European Athletics Championships medalists